The 1996 Omloop Het Volk was the 50th edition of the Omloop Het Volk cycle race and was held on 2 March 1996. The race started in Ghent and finished in Lokeren. The race was won by Tom Steels.

General classification

References

1996
Omloop Het Nieuwsblad
Omloop Het Nieuwsblad
March 1996 sports events in Europe